Toyin Sokefun-Bello (born 14 January 1978), better known as TY Bello, is a Nigerian singer, songwriter, photographer and philanthropist. Prior to pursuing a solo career, she was a member of the now defunct gospel band Kush. TY Bello is also a member of the Nigerian photography collective, Depth of Field. She is best known for her singles "Greenland", "Ekundayo", "This Man", "Freedom" and "Funmise".

Life and career

Early life and career beginnings
TY Bello was born on 14 January 1978, in Ogun State, Nigeria. She attained a degree in economics from the University of Lagos. She briefly practised journalism and eventually ventured into photography. TY Bello emerged onto Nigeria's musical landscape as a member of the defunct group KUSH, an acronym for Kinetically Ushering Salvation into Hearts and Homes. Other members of the group included Lara George, Dapo Torimiro and rapper Emem Ema. Kush gained popularity in the early 2000s with the single "Let's Live Together"; the group managed to release an album before disbanding. TY Bello was the official photographer to former President Goodluck Jonathan during his tenure in office; she also does work for Thisday fashion magazine.

2008–2013:Greenland, The Future, The Jubilee Collection and anti-rape campaign
In 2008, TY Bello released her debut studio album Greenland. It was produced by Mosa Adegboye and took two years to develop. The album earned her a Nigeria Music Award and a Sound City Award. TY Bello describes the album as a journey of her everyday life. The album's lyrical content explores themes of love, family and nation. Its title track is an inspirational song written to motivate Nigerians to liberate themselves from a place of despair to a place of hope.

TY Bello first revealed plans about her second studio album, The Future, while speaking to Ariya Today. The album was originally slated for release in 2011, and was ranked 12th on Nigerian Entertainment Today'''s list of the 12 Albums to Buy in 2011. The singer said she worked with producer Mosa and recorded the album in a few months. On 19 February 2011, TY Bello released "The Future" as the lead single from the album of the same name. The song urges Nigerian youth to be the change they seek. The Kemi Adetiba-directed music video for "The Future" was released on 3 April 2011. It features cameo appearances from Tara Fela-Durotoye, Sound Sultan, Chude Jideonwo and Banky W. Ore Fakorede awarded the song 7 stars out of 10, saying its "soft tribal drums, synths and a piano provide a vivid backdrop for TY to contrast her unmistakable voice against, and this she does brilliantly, bringing the poignancy in the song’s lyrics to life." Dapo Osewa of Sahara Reporters described the video as "a narrative in itself that dares to capture the varying and boundless composition of emotion that is the face of the Nigerian." Makeup brand House of Tara launched The Jubilee Collection, a limited edition line of makeup inspired by "The Future" single.

In October 2011, TY Bello was one of the celebrities featured in an eight-minute anti-rape video compiled by the Nigerian Ministry of Youth Development. The anti-rape video sheds light on the victim of a gang rape at Abia State University in 2011. In December 2013, TY Bello released the Wale Adenuga-assisted single "Yahweh". The song features additional vocals from Nwando Okeke and Mosa. TY Bello wrote the song's first line in 2004 during a photo-shoot.

2014:The Morning Songbook
On 10 October 2014, TY Bello released her third studio album The Morning Songbook for free digital download on SoundCloud. It was released without any promotion and comprises 10 tracks, including "Yahweh", "Thirsty" and "Jesu Jesu". The album features collaborations with M Sugh and Fela Durotoye. Udochukwu Ikwuagwu of the Breaking Times gave the album 7 stars out of 10, commending its production and TY Bello's songwriting.

Photography career
TY Bello was the official photographer to former President Goodluck Jonathan during his tenure in office; she also does work for Thisday fashion magazine.

2016: Tinie Tempah and a discovery
Bello was working in Lagos where she was creating a photo shoot for the British rapper Tinie Tempah. She later discovered that there was a remarkable looking woman in the background. In an attempt to find Olajumoke Orisaguna, she arranged for Orisaguna's picture to appear on the cover of Style magazine.

Humanitarian work
TY Bello organises an annual photography exhibition to raise funds for orphans in Nigeria. She is also the director of Link-a-child, an NGO dedicated to proliferating information on orphanages in Nigeria and seeking sponsorship on their behalf. In July 2011, TY Bello was honoured by the non-profit Communication For Change organisation in a five-part documentary film series, titled RedHot.

Personal life
TY Bello is married and gave birth to twin boys named Christian and Christopher on 10 October 2014, which coincidentally marked the release of The Morning Songbook.

DiscographyGreenland (2008)The Future (2011)The Morning Songbook (2014)Africa Awake (2020)We Are Fire'' (2022)

Awards and nominations

Soundcity Music Video Awards

!Ref
|-
|2009
|"Ekundayo"
|Best Female Video
|
|

Nigeria Entertainment Awards

!Ref
|-
|2008
|Herself
|Best New Act of the Year
|
|

The Headies

!Ref
|-
|rowspan="4"|2008
|rowspan="2"|Herself
|Recording Artiste of the Year
|
|rowspan="4"|
|-
|Hip Hop World Revelation of the Year
|
|-
|TY Bello for "Ekundayo"
|Best Vocal Performance (Female)
|
|-
|TY Bello & Abbey for "Greenland"
|Best Music Video (Director)
|

Creative Industry Awards

!Ref
|-
|2013
|Herself
|Visual Arts 
|
|

See also
 List of Nigerian gospel musicians
 Lola Akinmade Åkerström
List of Nigerian Women Photographers

References

External links

TY Bello at SoundCloud

Living people
Musicians from Ogun State
Nigerian gospel singers
Nigerian photographers
Nigerian women photographers
Nigerian philanthropists
University of Lagos alumni
Yoruba-language singers
English-language singers from Nigeria
Yoruba women musicians
Yoruba photographers
Yoruba women philanthropists
21st-century Nigerian singers
1978 births